Stambaugh may refer to:

 Stambaugh (surname)
 Stambaugh, Kentucky
 Stambaugh, Michigan, a former city, now merged with the city of Iron River, Michigan
 Stambaugh Township, Michigan

See also
 Camp Stambaugh (disambiguation)